Cafundó is 2005 Brazilian historical drama film written and directed by Paulo Betti and Clóvis Bueno and starring Lázaro Ramos. The film is a biopic based on miracle worker preto velho João de Camargo of Sorocaba and is based on the book João de Camargo de Sorocaba: O Nascimento de uma Religião by Carlos de Campos and Adolfo Frioli. The title comes from a former quilombo, the source of João de Camargo's original spiritual inspiration, located in today's Salto de Pirapora.

Plot
São Paulo state, 1890s. João is a former slave and the son of an Orisha priestess and works as a muleherd for a coronel. One day, he and his close friend Cirino decide to leave the farm. João takes his mother to Cafundó, the bastion of Afro-American religion in the vicinity. However, João leaves the community and takes errands to work in menial jobs. He meets a possessed white prostitute named Rosário and falls in love. Only after an unhappy marriage with Rosário and his mother's demise, João has a series of visions and decides to work as a spiritual leader for Sorocaba. In 1906, he builds a church with help from Cirino and begins to preach his syncretic faith, which is a blend of Orisha worship, veneration of Catholic saints, and eventually Kardecist spiritism.

Cast

Lázaro Ramos as João de Camargo
Leona Cavalli as Rosário
Leandro Firmino da Hora as Cirino
Alexandre Rodrigues as Natalino
Ernani Moraes as Coronel João Justino
Luís Melo as Monsignor João Soares
Renato Consorte as Minister
Francisco Cuoco as Bishop
Abrahão Farc as Judge

Production
To reconstruct the atmosphere of the 19th century, the natural scenery of Ponta Grossa and historic buildings of Lapa, Paranaguá and Antonina were chosen as filming locations.

Reception
The film won five gold Kikitos at the Gramado Film Festival, in the categories of best actor (Lázaro Ramos), best art direction, best cinematography and the special jury prize. It was also awarded as best film and best cinematography, at ParatyCine.

See also
 Slavery in Brazil
 Umbanda

References

External links 
 

2005 biographical drama films
Brazilian biographical drama films
2000s historical drama films
Brazilian historical drama films
2005 directorial debut films
2005 films
Films about Brazilian slavery
Films about Spiritism
Films about religion
Films shot in Paraná (state)